In affine geometry, a cap set is a subset of  (an -dimensional affine space over a three-element field) with no three elements in a line.
The first few cap set sizes are 1, 2, 4, 9, 20, 45, 112, ... .

Cap sets may be defined more generally as subsets of finite affine or projective spaces with no three in line, where these objects are simply called caps. The "cap set" terminology should be distinguished from other unrelated mathematical objects with the same name, and in particular from sets with the compact absorption property in function spaces as well as from compact convex co-convex subsets of a convex set.

Example

An example of cap sets comes from the card game Set, a card game in which each card has four features (its number, symbol, shading, and color), each of which can take one of three values. The cards of this game can be interpreted as representing points of the four-dimensional affine space , where each coordinate of a point specifies the value of one of the features. A line, in this space, is a triple of cards that, in each feature, are either all the same as each other or all different from each other. The game play consists of finding and collecting lines among the cards that are currently face up, and a cap set describes an array of face-up cards in which no lines may be collected.

One way to construct a large cap set in the game Set would be to choose two out of the three values for each feature, and place face up each of the cards that uses only one of those two values in each of its features. The result would be a cap set of 16 cards. However, in 1971, Giuseppe Pellegrino proved that four-dimensional cap sets have maximum size 20. In terms of Set, this result means that some layouts of 20 cards have no line to be collected, but that every layout of 21 cards has at least one line.

Maximum size
Since the work of Pellegrino in 1971, and of Tom Brown and Joe Buhler, who in 1984 proved that cap-sets cannot constitute any constant proportion of the whole space, there has been a significant line of research on how large they may be.

Lower bounds
and then .

Upper bounds
This question also appeared in a paper published by Noga Alon and Moshe Dubiner in 1995. In the same year, Roy Meshulam proved that the size of a cap set does not exceed  .

In 2019, Sander Dahmen, Johannes Hölzl and Rob Lewis formalised the proof of this upper bound in the Lean theorem prover.

As of September 2022, there is no exponential improvement to Ellenberg and Gijswijt's upper bound.

Mutually disjoint capsets
In 2013, five researchers together published an analysis of all the ways in which spaces of up to size AG(4,3) can be partitioned into disjoint capsets. They reported that it is possible to use four different capsets of size 20 in AG(4,3) that between them cover 80 different cells; the single cell left uncovered is called the anchor of each of the four capsets, the single point that when added to the 20 points of a capset makes the entire sum go to 0 (mod 3). All capsets in such a disjoint collection share the same anchor. Results for larger sizes are still open as of 2021.

Applications

Sunflower conjecture

The solution to the cap set problem can also be used to prove a partial form of the sunflower conjecture, namely that if a family of subsets of an -element set has no three subsets whose pairwise intersections are all equal, then the number of subsets in the family is at most  for a constant .

Matrix multiplication algorithms
The upper bounds on cap sets imply lower bounds on certain types of algorithms for matrix multiplication.

Strongly regular graphs

The Games graph is a strongly regular graph with 729 vertices. Every edge belongs to a unique triangle, so it is a locally linear graph, the largest known locally linear strongly regular graph. Its construction is based on the unique 56-point cap set in the five-dimensional ternary projective space (rather than the affine space that cap-sets are commonly defined in).

See also
No-three-in-line problem, a problem of avoiding three elements in a line in a two-dimensional grid

References

Ramsey theory